Loi Lan is a mountain of the Shan Hills. It is located in Shan State, Burma, 75 km to the south of Langhko.

Geography
Loi Lan, meaning "Bald Hill" in the Shan language, is part of a massif with multiple peaks located near the border with Thailand, about 4 km to the west of Wān Mae Aw and 15 km to the southwest of Homein.

See also
List of mountains in Burma

References

External links
Google Books, The Physical Geography of Southeast Asia

Geography of Shan State
Mountains of Myanmar
Shan Hills
Myanmar–Thailand border